The 2013 Coupe de la Ligue Final was the 19th final of France's football league cup competition, the Coupe de la Ligue, a football competition for the 42 teams that the Ligue de Football Professionnel (LFP) manages. The final took place on 20 April 2013 at the Stade de France in Saint-Denis and was contested between Saint-Étienne and Rennes. Marseille were the defending champions, capturing their third title in a row in the 2012 Coupe de la Ligue Final, but were eliminated by Paris Saint-Germain in the round of 16. The winner qualified for the 2013–14 UEFA Europa League in the third qualifying round, depending on their league finish.

Route to the final

Match

Details

References

External links
  

Coupe De La Ligue Final
2013
Coupe De La Ligue Final 2013
Coupe De La Ligue Final 2013
Coupe De La Ligue Final
Coupe De La Ligue Final 2013
Coupe De La Ligue Final 2013
Coupe De La Ligue Final